Whitney School may refer to:

in Canada
Sir James Whitney School for the Deaf, Belleville, Ontario

in the United States (by state)
Eli Whitney Elementary School, Stratford, Connecticut
Whitney School (Boise, Idaho), listed on the National Register of Historic Places (NRHP) in Ada County
Whitney School (Green Bay, Wisconsin), NRHP-listed in Brown County
May Whitney School, Lake Zurich, Illinois
Cora B. Whitney School, Bennington, Vermont, NRHP-listed in Bennington County

See also
Whitney High School (disambiguation)